North Third Avenue Historic District is a national historic district located at Siler City, Chatham County, North Carolina.  The district encompasses seven contributing buildings in a predominantly residential section of Siler City. They were built between about 1890 and 1930, and includes five primary residential dwellings and the First Baptist Church and parsonage.  They are representative examples of the Classical Revival and Bungalow / American Craftsman architectural styles.

It was listed on the National Register of Historic Places in 2000.

References

Historic districts on the National Register of Historic Places in North Carolina
Neoclassical architecture in North Carolina
Historic districts in Chatham County, North Carolina
National Register of Historic Places in Chatham County, North Carolina